The 2018 Judo Grand Prix Cancún was held in Cancún, Mexico, from 12 to 14 October 2018.

Medal summary

Men's events

Women's events

Source Results

Medal table

References

External links
 

2018 IJF World Tour
2018 Judo Grand Prix
Sport in Cancún
2018 in Mexican sports
October 2018 sports events in Mexico